Azadeh Ensha (born in Tehran, Iran) is an Iranian-American journalist who works for The New York Times. She has written for the business, foreign, metro, style and culture desks.

Personal
Fluent in Persian and French, Ensha graduated summa cum laude, Phi Beta Kappa from UCLA and received a master's degree from the Columbia University Graduate School of Journalism.

Notes

Mass media people from Tehran
University of California, Los Angeles alumni
Columbia University Graduate School of Journalism alumni
The New York Times writers
Living people
American writers of Iranian descent
Year of birth missing (living people)